Parchestan or Perchestan may refer to various places in Iran:
 Parchestan-e Al Kalu, Khuzestan Province
 Parchestan-e Ali Hoseyn Molla, Khuzestan Province
 Parchestan-e Fazel, Khuzestan Province
 Parchestan-e Gurui, Khuzestan Province
 Parchestan-e Owrak Shalu, Khuzestan Province
 Parchestan, Lorestan